is a former Japanese football player.

Club statistics

References

External links

1984 births
Living people
Chukyo University alumni
Association football people from Aichi Prefecture
Japanese footballers
J2 League players
Ehime FC players
Association football midfielders